Daejeon Korea Ginseng Corporation is a South Korean professional women's volleyball team. The team was founded in 1988 and became fully professional in 2005. They are based in Daejeon and are members of the Korea Volleyball Federation (KOVO). Their home arena is Chungmu Gymnasium in Daejeon.

Honours 
 Korea Volleyball Super League
 Runners-up: 2002

V-League
Champions (3): 2005, 2009−10, 2011−12

KOVO Cup
Winners (2): 2008, 2018
Runners-up (4): 2007, 2011, 2016, 2019

Season-by-season records

Players

2022−23 team

See also 
 Anyang KGC
 KT&G

External links 
Official website 

Volleyball clubs established in 1988
1988 establishments in South Korea
Sport in Daejeon
Women's volleyball teams in South Korea
KGC Sports Club